Easton State Airport  is a public use airport located two nautical miles (3.7 km) north of the central business district of Easton, in Kittitas County, Washington, United States. It is owned by the Washington State DOT Aviation Division.

It was constructed in the 1930s by the federal government as an emergency field for DC-3s crossing the Cascades through Snoqualmie Pass. It was acquired by the state in 1958 to preserve it for future use. Easton remains as an important airport on the eastern approaches to Snoqualmie and Stampede Pass.

Facilities and aircraft 

Trees surround the airport and there are trees in both approaches close in. Deer, elk, and motorcyclists also enjoy the airport. The surface is somewhat rough, and will be soft when wet. An overflight is recommended to check field conditions and obstructions. The airport is generally open from June 1 to October 1.

For the 12-month period ending May 31, 2007, the airport had 300 general aviation aircraft operations, an average of 25 per month. It is an excellent facility for mountain flying / soft field practice. Glider and flying clubs frequently use the field during the summer.

References

External links
 Easton State Airport page at WSDOT Aviation

Airports in Washington (state)
Transportation buildings and structures in Kittitas County, Washington